Sancho of Portugal may refer to:
 Sancho I of Portugal, nicknamed the Populator, (1154 - 1212)
 Sancho II of Portugal, nicknamed "the Pious" and "the Caped" or "the Capuched", (1209 - 1248)